S. N. Bose National Centre for Basic Sciences (SNBNCBS) is an autonomous research institute dedicated to basic research in mathematics sciences under the Department of Science and Technology of Government of India. It is located in West Bengal, Salt Lake, Kolkata. This institute was named after the Indian scientist Satyendra Nath Bose and established in 1986. Chanchal Kumar Majumdar was the founder director of this institute.

As this is a research institute, mainly Ph.D. program is done here. From 2001 Integrated Ph.D. (M.Sc.+Ph.D.) program was started. After completion of two years of study, a M.Sc. degree is given by University of Calcutta. Formerly, this degree was given by West Bengal University of Technology. Students of this institute can submit their Ph.D. thesis to Jadavpur University, the University of Calcutta, West Bengal University of Technology or any other university which allows students to do so.

See also
List of colleges in West Bengal
Education in West Bengal

References

External links
 

Research institutes in West Bengal
Research institutes in Kolkata
Multidisciplinary research institutes
Educational institutions established in 1986
University of Calcutta
Maulana Abul Kalam Azad University of Technology
1986 establishments in West Bengal